Amalia Paoli y Marcano ( 1861–1941) was a notable Puerto Rican soprano. She was the sister of tenor Antonio Paoli and of Olivia Paoli, a suffragist and activist who fought for the rights of women.

First years
Amalia Paoli was born in Ponce, Puerto Rico. She was the daughter of Domingo Paoli Marcatentti, born in Corsica, and Amalia Marcano Intriago, who was originally from Pampatar, Isla Margarita in Venezuela. Amalia Paoli's parents met in Caracas, and immediately fell in love; however, Amalia's father, a rich landlord, was opposed to the relationship because of class differences, therefore the young couple escaped to the Dominican Republic without getting married and later returned to Puerto Rico. The couple established themselves in the city of Yauco, but later moved into a house, given to them by Amalia's aunt, Teresa Intriago, located at one of the main arteries in the city of Ponce's urban core, Calle Mayor (Mayor Street), House No. 14. Ponce at the time was the financial and cultural capital of the island, thereby the ideal place for the initial cultural development of Paoli. In fact, his parents would often take her to operas at Ponce's Teatro La Perla located a block away from Paoli's residence.

Debut
Paoli first broke into the public eye with performances at Teatro La Perla. In 1880, when only 19 years old, she performed at La Perla in Emilio Arrieta's opera Marina.

Move to Europe
Paoli succeeded in catching the eye of what historian and Puerto Rico state historic preservation officer Juan Llanes Santos described as "well-connected people", who moved the young woman to Spain in 1883, where she auditioned for Isabel de Borbon. The sister of the King and Princess of Asturias, Isabel provided her patronage to Paoli, securing singing lessons for her from Napoleon Verger who was, according to Santos, "the most famous singing teacher at the time in Madrid, Napoleon Verger." Paoli immediately brought her younger siblings to live with her, and, in 1896, with the assistance of the Royal family, secured a royal scholarship for her brother Antonio that would turn him into a world-renowned tenor.

Later years and death
In the early 1920s, Paoli moved back to Puerto Rico where she founded a music school in Santurce called the Academia Paoli. There, she joined her sister in the Suffragist Social League; she and her sister were among a number of renowned women artists to do so. 

Paoli died in 1941. She was buried at the Puerto Rico Memorial Cemetery in Carolina, Puerto Rico.

Legacy
Paoli is recognized in Ponce at the Park of the Illustrious Ponce Citizens, and a street was named after her in Toa Baja, Puerto Rico.

See also

 List of Puerto Ricans
History of women in Puerto Rico

References
Notes

Sources

Santos, Juan Llanes (Historian and State Historic Preservation Officer, Certifying Officer, State Historic Preservation Office (San Juan, Puerto Rico). August 11, 2009. In National Register of Historic Places Inventory – Registration Form – Casa Paoli. United States Department of the Interior. National Park Service. (Washington, D.C.) Listing Reference Number 09000769.

Puerto Rican operatic sopranos
1942 deaths
1861 births
Singers from Ponce
Puerto Rican people of Corsican descent